Lesego Motsepe (28 April 1974 – 20 January 2014) was a South African actress, social activist and singer best known for her role as Letti Matabane in Isidingo from 1998 to 2008. An HIV sufferer, she revealed her status in 2011, and she attracted significant controversy in 2012 when she discontinued her antiretroviral therapy, in favour of alternative medicine, as promoted by deceased former health minister Manto Tshabalala-Msimang.

Early life
Motsepe grew up in Meadowlands, and attended Technikon Pretoria where she obtained a diploma in speech and drama. At the age of 5, she acted in a mutton advertisement on television, which earned her the childhood nickname Nama Ya Nku (Setswana for "mutton").

Notable roles
Although best known for her role as Lettie Matabane in Isidingo, in which she played the sister of her former real-life boyfriend Tshepo Maseko, she enjoyed stage acting, and she played the lover of Steve Biko in the play "Biko - Where the Soul Resides", and the starring role in a musical at the State Theatre about Brenda Fassie.

References

External links
 IMDb Profile
 TVSA Actor Profile
 Snaparazzi Gallery

South African actresses
People from Johannesburg
AIDS-related deaths in South Africa
HIV/AIDS activists
1974 births
2014 deaths